The Gaza–Israel barrier is a border barrier located on the Israeli side of the Gaza–Israel border. The Erez Crossing, in the north of the Gaza Strip, is the only crossing point for people and goods coming from Israel into Gaza; there exists a second crossing point in the barrier, called the Kerem Shalom border crossing, which is exclusive for the crossing of goods coming from Egypt, as Israel does not allow goods to go directly from Egypt into Gaza through the Egypt–Gaza border.

A fence along the border was first constructed by Israel in 1994 as a security barrier, and has been rebuilt and upgraded since. It was constructed by Israel to control the movement of people as well as goods between the Gaza Strip and Israel, which it could not achieve by normal border crossings.

There is also one crossing along the Egypt–Gaza border, the Rafah Crossing, though it is limited to the crossing of people; as per Israel's demand, any cargo or goods that are to enter Gaza must go through Israel, usually through the Kerem Shalom border crossing.

Political background
In 1993, Israel and the Palestinian Liberation Organization signed the Oslo Accords establishing the Palestinian Authority with limited administrative control of the West Bank and Gaza Strip. Pursuant to the Accords, Israel continues to maintain control of the Gaza Strip's airspace, land borders (with the exception of Gaza's border with Egypt, abandoned by Israel in 2005), and territorial waters. 

In 2005, Israel unilaterally withdrew its troops from the Gaza Strip, along with thousands of Israeli settlers. Israel thus claims to have ended the occupation. However, this claim has been challenged on the basis that Israel continues to exercise control over Gaza's territorial waters and airspace, despite Gaza not being part of Israel and Gazans not having Israeli passports.

Barrier structure 
In the 1994 Interim Agreement on the West Bank and the Gaza Strip, it was agreed that "the security fence erected by Israel around the Gaza Strip shall remain in place and that the line demarcated by the fence, as shown on the map, shall be authoritative only for the purpose of the Agreement" (i.e. the barrier does not necessarily constitute the border). The initial barrier was completed in 1996.

Before the 2005 disengagement Israeli military maintained a one-kilometer buffer zone within Gaza along the border wall which prevented the militants to approach the border, sometimes with gunfire. After the IDF withdrawal the border became easily reachable by the Palestinians.  Therefore Israel launched the construction of the enhanced security system along  the Gaza border, estimated to cost $220 million and to be completed in mid-2006.

It includes a 7-meter wall with sensors, remote-control machine guns and barbed wire in the three areas where the border runs adjacent to Israeli settlements. The land taken from the corresponding kibbutzim was compensated for, with some controversies. 

Overall, the first barrier is a barbed-wire fence without sensors. The second barrier codenamed Hoovers A is  20 meters off and consist of a road and a fence with sensors. These existed before 2005. A new element is a 70-150 meter wide buffer zone codenamed Hoovers B with motion sensors in the ground and surrounded by a new sensor-equipped fence with watchtowers every 2 kilometers, equipped with  remote-control machine guns instead of soldiers, which could be targets of Palestinian snipers.

The barrier is patrolled both from the air and on the ground.

Response from Gaza
The barrier has met with opposition and protests from some Palestinians in Gaza.

The barrier was largely torn down by Palestinians at the beginning of the Al-Aqsa Intifada in September 2000, followed by many terror attacks. The barrier was rebuilt between December 2000 and June 2001. A one-kilometer buffer zone was added, in addition to new high technology observation posts. Soldiers were also given new rules of engagement, which, according to Ha'aretz, allow soldiers to fire at anyone seen crawling there at night illegally into Israeli territory. Palestinians attempting to cross the barrier into Israel by stealth have been shot and killed.

The barrier has been effective in preventing terrorists and suicide bombers from entering Israel from Gaza. Since 1996, virtually all suicide bombers trying to leave Gaza have detonated their charges at the barrier's crossing points and were stopped while trying to cross the barrier elsewhere. From 1994 until 2004 a suicide bomber originating from within the Gaza Strip successfully carried out an attack in Israel (the March 14, 2004 attack in Ashdod).

The barrier's effectiveness prompted a shift in the tactics of Palestinian militants who commenced firing Qassam rockets and mortars over the barrier.

On 27 December 2008, Israel launched the Gaza War, consisting of airstrikes and ground incursions against targets in the Gaza Strip, with the stated aim of stopping the rocket fire from and arms smuggling into the territory. The war ended on 18 January 2009, when both sides ceased military action. Israel completed its withdrawal on 21 January, and thousands of rockets and mortars have been fired from the Gaza Strip since.

Support for a similar Egypt–Gaza barrier
Palestinian Authority President Mahmoud Abbas declared support for the Egypt–Gaza barrier, adding: "It is the Egyptians’ sovereign right in their own country. Legitimate supplies should be brought through the legal crossings", although he made no such comment towards Israel's sovereign rights. The United States announced its support for the Egypt-Gaza barrier saying it would prevent weapons smuggling. Cairo's main Al-Azhar University officially backed the government's decision for an Egypt-Gaza barrier saying that it was the "state's right to build along its walls facilities and obstacles that will enhance its security."

Tunnels under the barrier

Because of the effectiveness of the barrier in stopping infiltration of Israel by militants, they adopted a strategy of digging tunnels under the barrier. On 25 June 2006, Palestinians used an 800-metre tunnel dug over a period of months to infiltrate Israel. They attacked a patrolling Israeli armored unit, killed two Israeli soldiers, and captured another one, Gilad Shalit.

Between January and October 2013, three other tunnels were identified – two of which were packed with explosives. The discovery of similarly constructed tunnels in other parts of the world have led to updated threat assessment estimates.

During the 2014 Gaza war, Israel encountered Hamas militants who popped out of tunnels into Israel and attacked soldiers along the border. After the war, Israel located and destroyed 32 tunnels. In 2018, Israel destroyed three new tunnels.

Underground anti-tunnel barrier 

In response to the large number of tunnels being dug, which could only be of use for infiltration by militants, in mid-2017, Israel began construction of an underground border wall several meters in depth along the entire 40-km length of the border. The wall is equipped with sensors that can detect tunnel construction. The wall is located entirely on Israeli land.

In October 2020, sensors in the underground structure identified a Hamas tunnel. An Israeli military official called the tunnel "The most significant tunnel we have seen to date, both in terms of depth and infrastructure".

The anti-tunnel barrier was completed in March 2021.

Crossing points
Since 2011, there are just two crossing points on the Israel-Gaza border: the northern Erez Crossing, for the crossing of people and goods coming from Israel, and the eastern Kerem Shalom border crossing, for the crossing of goods coming from Egypt, as Israel does not allow goods to go directly from Egypt into Gaza through the Egypt–Gaza border.

Previous crossing points between Israel and Gaza were the Sufa Crossing, permanently closed by Israel in 2008, and the Karni crossing, permanently closed by Israel in 2011.

From the Palestinian perspective, the crossings are crucial to the economy of the Gaza Strip and to the daily needs of the population. Chief Palestinian Authority negotiator Saeb Erekat analyzed the closures of the crossings and said they have "proven to be counter-productive".

Erez Crossing

The Erez Crossing is a pedestrian and cargo crossing into Israel, located in northern Gaza. The crossing is currently restricted to Arab residents under the jurisdiction of the Palestinian Authority and to Egyptian nationals or international aid officials only, and is closed to tourists. Palestinians who have a permit to work in Israel or those with permits allowing them to receive free medical treatment or to visit immediate family who are in prisons may use this crossing when it is open for pedestrian travel.

Though 5,000 Palestinians are permitted to use the Erez Crossing to go to their places of work inside Israel, the crossing was frequently closed by the Israeli authorities, impeding their ability to get to work. Additionally, the permits issued have not always been honoured by soldiers, who in some cases confiscated them at the crossing.

Kerem Shalom Crossing 
The Kerem Shalom border crossing is a border crossing at the Gaza Strip–Israel border, managed by the Israel Airports Authority, used by trucks carrying goods from Israel or Egypt to the Gaza Strip.

See also
 Egypt–Gaza barrier
 Israeli West Bank barrier
 Egypt–Gaza border
 2018–2019 Gaza border protests

References

External links
 

Borders of the Gaza Strip
Borders of Israel
Border barriers
Fortifications in Israel
Fortifications in the State of Palestine
Counterterrorism in Israel
Gaza–Israel conflict
Barrier
1990s establishments in Israel